Maple Lake is a city in Wright County, Minnesota, United States. The population was 2,159 at the 2020 census. Minnesota State Highway 55 serves as a main route in the city.

History
Maple Lake was laid out in 1886, and named for its location in Maple Lake Township.

Geography

Demographics

2010 census
As of the census of 2010, there were 2,059 people, 773 households, and 528 families living in the city. The racial makeup of the city was 97.2% White, 0.7% African American, 0.2% Native American, 0.3% Asian, 0.2% from other races, and 1.4% from two or more races. Hispanic or Latino of any race were 0.9% of the population.

There were 773 households, of which 41.0% had children under the age of 18 living with them, 52.8% were married couples living together, 10.3% had a female householder with no husband present, 5.2% had a male householder with no wife present, and 31.7% were non-families. 27.0% of all households were made up of individuals, and 9.9% had someone living alone who was 65 years of age or older. The average household size was 2.63 and the average family size was 3.22.

The median age in the city was 32.3 years. 31% of residents were under the age of 18; 7.3% were between the ages of 18 and 24; 29.9% were from 25 to 44; 22.4% were from 45 to 64; and 9.3% were 65 years of age or older. The gender makeup of the city was 48.7% male and 51.3% female.

2000 census
As of the census of 2000, there were 1,633 people, 621 households, and 388 families living in the city. The racial makeup of the city was 99.02% White, 0.24% African American, 0.06% Native American, 0.18% Asian, 0.24% from other races, and 0.24% from two or more races. Hispanic or Latino of any race were 0.98% of the population. 52.4% were of German, 8.6% Irish and 7.4% Norwegian ancestry according to Census 2000.

There were 621 households, out of which 35.6% had children under the age of 18 living with them, 51.9% were married couples living together, 6.3% had a female householder with no husband present, and 37.5% were non-families. 30.4% of all households were made up of individuals, and 15.8% had someone living alone who was 65 years of age or older.  The average household size was 2.62 and the average family size was 3.38.

In the city, the population was spread out, with 30.3% under the age of 18, 9.9% from 18 to 24, 31.8% from 25 to 44, 14.5% from 45 to 64, and 13.5% who were 65 years of age or older.  The median age was 32 years. For every 100 females, there were 98.9 males.  For every 100 females age 18 and over, there were 98.8 males.

The median income for a household in the city was $43,047.50, and the median income for a family was $54,423. Males had a median income of $35,375 versus $25,250 for females. The per capita income for the city was $17,476.  About 2.3% of families and 5.5% of the population were below the poverty line, including 4.3% of those under age 18 and 15.6% of those age 65 or over.

Notable people
 William Henry Bullock – (1927–2011), an American Roman Catholic bishop. He was the Bishop of the Roman Catholic Diocese of Madison, Wisconsin. Born in Maple Lake.
 Arnold D. Gruys - (1928-2020), a member of the Minnesota House of Representatives. Born in Maple Lake.
 James Jude - (1928-2015), an American surgeon, known for the development of the external cardiac massage, one of the components of CPR. Born in Maple Lake.
 Marion O'Neill- a member of the Minnesota House of Representatives. She represents District 29B and lives in Maple Lake

References

External links
 City Website
 Maple Lake Messenger newspaper

Cities in Minnesota
Cities in Wright County, Minnesota
Populated places established in 1858
1858 establishments in Minnesota